Lilium bosniacum is a lily native to Bosnia and Herzegovina. It's also known as Zlatni Ljiljan (Bosnian for golden lily) and Bosanski Ljiljan (Bosnian lily).

L. bosniacum has often been lumped and split and lumped again. Some results of molecular studies support it as an infraspecific taxon of Lilium carniolicum. Lilium bosniacum, together with Lilium albanicum and Lilium jankae have been treated as varieties of Lilium carniolicum.

However, extensive DNA-analyses have shown that this group is polyphyletic.

Description
Lilium bosniacum Beck ex Fritsch 1909 Section 3b
Syn.: ''L. carniolicum var. bosniacumno

Bulb:  ovoid, 6–7 cm in diameter, yellowish.

Stem:  30–90 cm.

Leaves:  densely scattered, horizontal with tips curved upwards, narrowly lanceolate with slightly hairy margins.

Flowers:  1–6 in a raceme, nodding, fragrant. Tepals strongly revolute, typical Turk's cap-shape, wax-like texture, yellow to orange without spots, ~6 cm in diameter.  Seeds with delayed hypogeal germination. Flowering time ~July. 2n=24.

Origin:  Bosnia and Herzegovina.

Symbolic use
The golden lily is a traditional symbol of the Bosniak people, and was a heraldic national symbol of medieval Bosnia and a coat of arms of the Republic of Bosnia and Herzegovina.

See also
List of Balkan endemic plants

References

bosniacum
Flora of Bosnia and Herzegovina